Sewing-Machine Needles, also known as Rocas Ministro Ezcurra is a group of three prominent rock needles, the highest 45 m above water, lying close southeast of Rancho Point, Deception Island, in the South Shetland Islands. The name Sewing-Machine Rock was given by whalers for what was originally a conspicuous natural arch. Needles is now considered the more suitable descriptive term; an earthquake tremor in 1924 caused the arch to collapse. The name Rocas Ministro Ezcurra was given by Dr Douglas (later Sir Douglas) Mawson, leader of the Australasian Antarctic Expedition of 1912-14.

These rocks are remnants of a tuff cone, part of the Baily Head Formation.

See also 
 Composite Antarctic Gazetteer
 List of Antarctic islands south of 60° S
 SCAR
 Territorial claims in Antarctica

References

External links
 SCAR Composite Antarctic Gazetteer.

Rock formations of Antarctica
Geography of Deception Island